
Gmina Trzcianka is an urban-rural gmina (administrative district) in Czarnków-Trzcianka County, Greater Poland Voivodeship, in west-central Poland.

Villages
Apart from the town of Trzcianka, Gmina Trzcianka contains the villages and settlements of Biała, Biernatowo, Dłużewo, Ginterowo, Górnica, Kadłubek, Karcze, Kępa, Kochanówka, Łomnica, Łomnica Druga, Łomnica Pierwsza, Łomnica-Folwark, Łomnica-Młyn, Niekursko, Nowa Wieś, Ogorzałe, Osiniec, Pańska Łaska, Pokrzywno, Przyłęki, Radolin, Rudka, Runowo, Rychlik, Sarcz, Siedlisko, Smolarnia, Smolary, Stobno, Straduń, Teresin, Teresin-Karczma, Wapniarnia Pierwsza, Wapniarnia Trzecia and Wrząca.

Neighbouring gminas
Gmina Trzcianka is bordered by the gminas of Czarnków, Człopa, Szydłowo, Ujście, Wałcz and Wieleń.

References
Polish official population figures 2006

Trzcianka
Czarnków-Trzcianka County